Halsey Rodman (born 1973) is an artist based in New York City.

Rodman was born in Davis, California.  He makes installations containing assemblages, videos, photography, text and figurative sculpture, which form mythological narratives.  Common motifs in Rodman's work are hexagons, clouds of smoke, pickles and geometric forms

Rodman received his BA from the College of Creative Studies, University of California, Santa Barbara in 1995 and his MFA from Columbia University, New York in 2003.

Selected exhibitions

2009: Pinch Pots and Pyramids, Kate Werble Gallery, New York City, with Susana Rodríguez, Liliane Lijn, Sam Moyer, Ryan Reggiani and Molly Smith.  
2007: The Performative Object, The Institute of Contemporary Art at Maine College of Art
2006: The Navigator's Quarters Must Not Be Disturbed, Guild & Greyshkul, New York
2005: The Minded Swarm, LACE, Los Angeles
2004: drift:shift, Linda Schwartz Gallery, Cincinnati
2004: Kis Multiplied, Triple Candie, New York 
2003: One Enemy vs. 25 Millions of Friends, Kunsthochschule Kassel, Germany
2000: One and Many Suns, Caltech University, Pasadena
1997: Quartzose, Galleri Tommy Lund, Denmark

References

External links
Halsey Rodman at Guild & Greyshkul
Images, texts and biography from the Saatchi Gallery
Jerry Saltz, States of Change

American artists
Living people
1973 births
University of California, Santa Barbara alumni
Columbia University School of the Arts alumni